Puya floccosa is a species in the genus Puya. This species is native to Costa Rica and Venezuela.

References

floccosa
Flora of Costa Rica
Flora of Venezuela